HMS Peony was a  of the Royal Navy. In 1943 she was transferred to the Royal Hellenic Navy as RHNS Sachtouris, serving throughout World War II and the Greek Civil War. She was returned to the Royal Navy in 1951 and scrapped in April 1952.

Royal Navy
Throughout her Royal Navy career Peony escorted convoys: primarily in home waters, but sometimes in the Mediterranean Sea and to Freetown in Sierra Leone.

From late 1940 to early 1941 she was part of the 10th Corvette Group, Mediterranean Fleet based at Alexandria, with which she escorted numerous convoys to Malta. In February 1941 she was equipped for minesweeping as not enough minesweepers were available. In July 1941 she helped to transport troops to Cyprus. She undertook anti-submarine operations off Cyprus in the following months. Along with the Australian destroyer , three corvettes and two anti-submarine aircraft she attacked a U-boat on 8 October 1941, but the U-boat escaped.

In December 1941 while escorting Mediterranean convoy AT-6 from Alexandria to Tobruk, the  torpedoed the Polish steamer Warszawa and attacked Peony. Peony took Warszawa in tow until another torpedo from the U-boat sank the steamship with the loss of 23 men. Peony and  rescued the survivors.

Peony went to Salvias rescue but found no survivors: only a patch of oil.

Royal Hellenic Navy

In 1943 Peony was transferred to the Royal Hellenic Navy, which renamed her as the "Royal Ship Sachtouris" (ΒΠ Σαχτούρης) after Georgios Sachtouris, an admiral in the Greek War of Independence.

She served the remainder of the Second World War under the Greek flag.  She also served in the Greek Civil War that broke out after the end of the Second World War.

In 1947 the United States in what became known as the Truman Doctrine declared its support the Greek government in its war against Communist guerrillas. In the early 1950s the Mutual Defense Assistance Act started the transfer of American ships to Greece. Four s entered Greek service and so the old British Flower-class corvettes were superseded.

Fate
Sachtouris was returned to the Royal Navy in September 1951 and scrapped on 21 April 1952.

Notes

References

Sources

naval-history.net

Flower-class corvettes of the Royal Navy
Flower-class corvettes of the Hellenic Navy
World War II corvettes of the United Kingdom
1940 ships
Ships built in Belfast
Ships built by Harland and Wolff
Corvettes of the Cold War